Municipal and regional elections in Peru were held on Sunday, 2 October 2022, electing authorities for the period 2023–2026. Since 2018, municipal and regional officials cannot serve consecutive terms.

Electoral system

Regional 
Regional governments are constituted as the administrative and governing body of the departments of Peru. They are composed of the regional governor, the regional lieutenant governor and the Regional Council.

Voting is based on universal suffrage, which includes all national citizens over the age of eighteen, registered and resident in each department and in full enjoyment of their political rights, as well as non-national citizens residing and registered in the department.

The governor and regional lieutenant governor are elected by direct suffrage. For a candidate to be proclaimed the winner, they must obtain no less than 30% of valid votes. In case no candidate achieves that percentage in the first round of elections, the two most voted candidates participate in a second round or ballot. There is no immediate reelection of regional governors.

Municipal 
Provincial and district municipalities constitute the administrative and governing body of the provinces and districts of Peru. They are composed of the mayor and the municipal council (provincial and district).

Voting is based on universal suffrage, which includes all national citizens over the age of eighteen, registered and resident in the province or district and in full enjoyment of their political rights, as well as non-national citizens residing and registered in the province or district. There is no immediate reelection of mayors.

The municipal councils are composed of between 5 and 15 councilors (except that of the province of Lima, composed of 39 councilors) elected by direct suffrage for a period of four (4) years, in conjunction with the election of the mayor (who presides over the council). Voting is by closed and blocked list. The winning list is assigned the seats according to the d'Hondt method or half plus one, whichever favors it the most.

Campaigning 
For the mayoral elections in Lima, Rafael López Aliaga of Popular Renewal, Luis Molina of Avanza País and Álvaro Paz de la Barra of Faith in Peru announced their campaigns in early 2022. López Aliaga said that if elected, he would resign from office to run in the 2026 presidential elections, choosing Renzo Reggiardo as a successor to his potential mayoral term.

Regional elections

Municipal elections

Provinces

Districts

References 

Peru
2022 in Peru
Municipal elections in Peru
Election and referendum articles with incomplete results
October 2022 events in South America